Second World is a South Korean survival program by JTBC. 8 female idol rappers compete against each other to showcase their vocal abilities.

Judges 
The judges, named "Voice leaders" in the show:
 Kim Bum-soo
 Jungyup
 Jeong Eun-ji
 Seo Eun-kwang
 Kim Min-seok

Contestants

Performances

Prequel - The Moment of Work (Episode 1)

Round 1 - Title Match (Episode 2-3)

Round 2 - Unit Match (Episode 4)

Round 3 - Producer Match (Episode 5-7)

Round 4 - Death Match (Episode 7-9)

Preliminary Results

Points Summary (Rounds 1-4)

Final Round (Episode 10)

Final ranking

Discography

The Second World Episode 2

The Second World Episode 3

The Second World Episode 4

The Second World Episode 5

The Second World Episode 6

The Second World Episode 7

The Second World Episode 8

The Second World FINAL

Ratings

References

External links
  

2022 South Korean television series debuts
Korean-language television shows
Music competitions in South Korea
South Korean reality television series
South Korean music television shows
South Korean variety television shows
JTBC original programming
Reality music competition television series
K-pop television series
2022 South Korean television series endings